The 2017 Kentucky Derby  (in full, the Kentucky Derby Presented by Yum! Brands, due to sponsorship) was the 143rd running of the Kentucky Derby, and took place on Saturday, May 6, 2017. The Kentucky Derby is a horse race held each year in Louisville, Kentucky, on the first Saturday in May, at the end of the two-week-long Kentucky Derby Festival. The race was broadcast by NBC with a scheduled post time of 6:34 PM ET. The race went off at 6:52 PM ET before a crowd of 158,070 and a television TAD of 16.5 million viewers. The winner was the post-time favorite, Always Dreaming.

Qualification

The field for the Kentucky Derby was limited to twenty horses who qualified based on points earned in the Road to the Kentucky Derby, a series of races that was first introduced in 2013. Girvin was the top point-earner in 2017 after winning both the Risen Star Stakes and the Louisiana Derby. Classic Empire, who was the early Derby favorite after winning the Breeders' Cup Juvenile in 2016, finished second in the qualifying series after overcoming several setbacks to win the Arkansas Derby. The other major prep race winners were Gormley (Santa Anita Derby), Irap (Blue Grass Stakes), Irish War Cry (Wood Memorial), Always Dreaming (Florida Derby) and Thunder Snow (UAE Derby). Several other contenders did not enter due to injuries or because they raced inconsistently. For example, Not This Time was an early favorite for the Derby but was injured shortly after finishing second in the Breeders' Cup Juvenile and was retired from racing. After an impressive win in the San Felipe Stakes, Mastery was pulled up by his jockey and was found to have a condylar fracture requiring several months to heal.

For the first time, a spot in the starting gate was set aside for a horse from Japan through the separate Japan Road to the Kentucky Derby. Epicharis, a grandson of 1989 Kentucky Derby winner Sunday Silence, qualified by winning the Hyacinth Stakes at Tokyo Racecourse on February 19. However, the connections of Epicharis declined the invitation.

Field
On May 3, entries for the Derby were taken and the post position draw was streamed live by Churchill Downs.  After drawing post position 14, Classic Empire was installed as the lukewarm favorite on the morning line at 4–1 by Mike Battaglia. Always Dreaming in post position 5 and McCraken in post position 15 were both given odds of 5–1.

The entry fee is normally $25,000, but Fast and Accurate was required to pay a supplemental entry fee of $200,000 as he was not nominated to the Triple Crown earlier in the year.  The two "also eligible" entries were scratched when none of the qualified horses opted to withdraw before the 9 a.m. Friday deadline.

Race description
When betting opened, the odds for morning line favorite Classic Empire drifted up to 6.80/1 while those for Always Dreaming drifted down to 4.70/1, making Always Dreaming the post time favorite. The track was labelled as "Wet Fast (sealed)" with some standing water due to persistent rain over the course of several days. In spite of the weather, 158,070 people attended the Derby, the seventh-highest turnout in the history of the race. The television broadcast drew 16.5 million viewers, the most since 18.5 million watched Sunday Silence win the 1989 Derby.

The race had a difficult start for several horses. The most striking aspect of the start was the shocking refusal of Thunder Snow to run. When the gates flew open Thunder Snow inexplicably begin to buck and writhe, refusing to proceed and immediately getting pulled up. The start for several other horses was disastrous due to a "chain reaction" caused by Irish War Cry who, in the 17th position, ducked to the inside at the start, pushing over number 16 Tapwrit, and as a result, the 15 horse, McCracken, bumped heavily with number 14, Classic Empire. "Classic Empire really got clobbered", said his trainer Mark Casse. "The track is impossible. Our horse ran extremely well, considering."

From post position five, Always Dreaming avoided traffic problems with a burst of early speed, then settled into second place behind long shot State of Honor. In the first turn, jockey John R. Velazquez kept the colt along the rail then moved him to the outside of State of Honor down the backstretch. The two raced together into the far turn, where State of Honor started to fade while Battle of Midway and Irish War Cry moved up to challenge for the lead. Always Dreaming quickly responded by drawing away, opening up a lead of several lengths. Lookin At Lee, who had run along the rail for most of the race, found racing room and made a late run, but never threatened Always Dreaming, who won by  lengths. Battle of Midway was five lengths behind in third with Classic Empire finishing fourth.

Trainer Todd Pletcher had entered the race with one win (Super Saver in 2010) from forty-five starters over the years. Although one of the most successful trainers in the history of the sport, Pletcher was relieved to get another Derby win with Always Dreaming. "To me", Pletcher said, "I felt I really needed that second one, you know?"

It was also the second Derby win for Velazquez, who had previously won in 2011 with Animal Kingdom. "This is the best horse Todd and I have ever come to the Kentucky Derby with", he said. "I got a good position early and then he relaxed. When we hit the quarter pole, I asked him and he responded. He did it himself from there."

It was the first Derby win for the ownership group that included Anthony Bonomo (who owns Brooklyn Boyz Stable), his wife Mary Ellen (MeB Racing), Vincent Viola (St Elias Stable) and his wife Teresa (Teresa Viola Racing). Mary Ellen Bonomo named the horse because of her tendency to daydream. "Everybody dreams of something, whether it's a big event or special day, the birth of their child, winning the Kentucky Derby. So I just said, 'Always Dreaming.' It just took off."

This was the fifth consecutive Derby in which the post-time favorite won. The only other time this happened was in the late 1890s.

Result

 Track: Wet Fast (sealed)

Times:  mile – 0:22.70;  mile – 0:46.53;  mile – 1:11.12; mile – 1:37.27; final – 2:03.59.Splits for each quarter-mile: (:22.70) (:23.83) (:24.59) (:26.15) (:26.32)

Source: Equibase chart

Payout
The Kentucky Derby payout schedule

 $2 Exacta: (5–1) $336.20
 $1 Trifecta: (5–1–11) $8,297.20
 $1 Superfecta: (5–1–11–14) $75,974.50
 $1 Super Hi 5 (Pentafecta): (5–1–11–14–19) $493,348.70

Subsequent Grade I wins
After winning the Derby, Always Dreaming never won another race. Several of the runners up went on to achieve Grade I success:
 Battle of Midway – Breeders' Cup Dirt Mile
 Practical Joke – H. Allen Jerkens Stakes
 Tapwrit – Belmont Stakes
 Girvin – Haskell Invitational
 Thunder Snow – Prix Jean Prat, 2018 & 2019 Dubai World Cup

References

External links

2017 in horse racing
Derby
2017
May 2017 sports events in the United States